The Piraí River is a river located in the Paraná state of southern Brazil.

See also
List of rivers of Paraná

References

External links
Brazilian Ministry of Transport

Rivers of Paraná (state)